Biabanak Rural District is a rural district (dehestan) in the Central District of Khur and Biabanak County, Isfahan Province, Iran. At the 2006 census, its population (including Farrokhi, which was subsequently detached from the rural district and promoted to city status) was 4,710, in 1,219 families; excluding Farrokhi, the population (as of 2006) was 1,995, in 551 families.  The rural district has 16 villages.

References 

Rural Districts of Isfahan Province
Khur and Biabanak County